Leftfoot is a musical event. It started life in Birmingham's Medicine Bar and the Bulls Head Public House in the suburb of Moseley in the late 1990s.

Primarily an acid jazz night, many other major music styles such as hip hop, funk and dub are included.

The residents and organisers are DJ Dick (originally from the Rum Runner nightclub and Rockers Hi-Fi) and Adam Regan.

Leftfoot has featured on BBC Radio 1 several times and at other events such as the Cheltenham International Jazz Festival.

Acts that have performed for Leftfoot include Gilles Peterson, Mr Scruff, DJ Patife, Cleveland Watkiss, Keb Darge, Roots Manuva, Bonobo and Ninja Tune records.

External links
Leftfoot record label "Different Drummer"
Leftfoot event flyers

Music in Birmingham, West Midlands